Loda Township is one of twenty-six townships in Iroquois County, Illinois, USA.  As of the 2010 census, its population was 1,461 and it contained 790 housing units.

Geography

Cities, towns, villages
 Loda

Cemeteries
The township contains Pine Ridge Cemetery.

Major highways
  Interstate 57
  U.S. Route 45

Lakes
Bayles Lake
Lake Iroquois

Demographics

School districts
 Cissna Park Community Unit School District 6
 Paxton-Buckley-Loda Community Unit School District 10

Political districts
 Illinois' 15th congressional district
 State House District 105
 State Senate District 53

References
 
 United States Census Bureau 2007 TIGER/Line Shapefiles
 United States National Atlas

External links
 City-Data.com
 Illinois State Archives

Townships in Iroquois County, Illinois
Townships in Illinois